Zalafa is an Arab village in Israel's Haifa District. Since 1996, it has been under the jurisdiction of the Ma'ale Iron local council whose headquarters is in the village. The village is divided into three neighborhoods: East, West and al-Murtafi'a. In mid-2016, Zalafa's population was 4,639, all of whom are Muslim.

History
According to archeological evidence, Zalafa location has been settled continuously since the Iron Age, but with a decline in the Ottoman era. Building foundations, burial tombs, potsherds from the Byzantine era and an ancient well can be found under the village.

Ottoman and British Mandate periods
According to local tradition, Zalafa was established in the mid-17th century by people from the nearby town of Umm al-Fahm. In 1870, French explorer Victor Guérin found the village "almost completely deserted", and in 1882 it was described as "a small ruined village with a well" by the PEF's Survey of Western Palestine (SWP).

The village's clay and straw houses were built close to each other for security reasons. Clan divisions were reflected in the distribution of the houses. Zalafa's residents drew water from nearby springs and the village lacked basic services such as schools, clinics, local government, banks, etc. Following the Jewish migration to Palestine, many of Zalafa's residents worked in Jewish-owned fields and settlements. In addition to being a new source of income, this work experience instilled in the residents advanced skills that improved their way of life.

In the 1922 census the population of the village was 156, all of whom were Muslim. In the 1931 census there were 198 Muslim residents living in 43 houses, increasing to 340 in the 1945 statistics. In 1944/45 a total of 2,677 dunums of village land was allocated for grains, 65 dunums were irrigated or used for orchards, and 8 dunams were classified as built-up areas.

State of Israel
During the 1948 Arab-Israeli War, the village and the surrounding area came under Iraqi control. In March 1949, Jordanian forces replaced the Iraqi forces in Wadi Ara.

On 3 April 1949, Israel and Jordan signed an armistice agreement, in which Israel would receive the Wadi Ara area, including Zalafa. In 1949, Givat Oz was established near the village.

Zalafa is one of the villages of Wadi Ara that lacked municipal status after the establishment of Israel. On 16 January 1979, Interior Minister Yosef Burg offered to establish a local council for Zalafa which would have included nearby Aqqada ( from Zalafa), Swisa ( from Zalafa) and al-Murtafi'a (connected to the village), which were in the municipal boundaries of Umm al-Fahm. The residents of Aqqada and Swisa refused the arrangement and considered their villages as part of Umm al-Fahm, though they already received civil services such as water and education from Zalafa. Burg doubted that Zalafa could bear the financial and administrative burden of having a local council, since the population of Zalafa at the time was 1,700 and with the three other villages, 2,100; thus it would have been a very small local council.

Zalafa was under the administration of mukhtars (village headmen), who were appointed by the Interior Ministry until 1992, when the Interior Ministry established the Nahal Iron regional council, including seven other villages. The locals objected to the administrative arrangement and sought independent municipal status for each village. To allay local concerns, the Interior Ministry established an investigative committee to examine other options, and in 1996, decided to split the regional council into two local councils: Ma'ale Iron, which includes Zalafa, and Basma. Al-Murtafi'a is today part of Zalafa. Between 2004 and 2010 the seat of Ma'ale Iron has been in a building in Zalafa leased by the local council.

Geography
The village is situated on a high hill, which allowed the residents to better defend themselves. It borders the Megiddo Regional Council to the north, with Givat Oz to the northeast and the municipal boundaries of Umm al-Fahm on the south. Zalafa's soil is fertile with an abundance of underground water, which aided the development of agriculture, the village's primary source of income and sustenance in its early history. Wadi Zalafa, a stream of the Kishon River, flows through the center of the village, dividing it into two parts: Zalafa al-Gharbiyya (=West) and Zalafa al-Sharkiyya (=East). North of the village is another stream that flows into the Kishon River as well.

Demographics

Population
According to the 2008 census of the Central Bureau of Statistics (CBS), Zalafa had 4,000 residents, 99.8% of them Muslim.
45.0% were under age 17, 51.3% were aged 18–64 and 3.7% were over 65. The median age was 20.

Labour
According to the 2008 CBS census, 29% of residents were in the annual civilian labour force; 49.3% of the men and 8.2% of the women. 53.2% of the male workforce worked in construction; 9% in manufacturing; 8.2% in wholesale, retail trade, and Auto Mechanism; 7.5% in transport, storage, and communications; and the rest in other sectors. 88.9% of the female workforce worked in education and 11.1% in transport, storage, and communications.

Sports
Zalafa has a local football team called "Hapoel Bnei Zalafa", participating in Liga Bet. The team hosts matches in a soccer fields located in Umm el-Fahm.

See also
Arab localities in Israel

References

Bibliography

External links
  Welcome To Zalafa  
Welcome To al-Murtafi'a
Survey of Western Palestine, Map 8:    IAA, Wikimedia commons 

Arab localities in Israel
Triangle (Israel)
Wadi Ara
17th-century establishments in Ottoman Syria